Diego López de Zúñiga may refer to:

 Diego López de Zúñiga, 4th Count of Nieva (c. 1510–1564), sixth viceroy of Peru, 1561–1564
 Diego López de Zúñiga (theologian) (died 1531), Spanish humanist and biblical scholar